St. Stephen's Cathedral is the mother church of the Roman Catholic Archdiocese of Vienna and the seat of the Archbishop of Vienna, Christoph Cardinal Schönborn, OP. The current Romanesque and Gothic form of the cathedral, seen today in the Stephansplatz, was largely initiated by Duke Rudolf IV (1339–1365) and stands on the ruins of two earlier churches, the first a parish church consecrated in 1147. The most important religious building in Vienna, St. Stephen's Cathedral has borne witness to many important events in Habsburg and Austrian history and has, with its multi-coloured tile roof, become one of the city's most recognizable symbols.

History
By the middle of the 12th century, Vienna had become an important centre of German civilization, and the four existing churches, including only one parish church, no longer met the town's religious needs. In 1137, Bishop of Passau Reginmar and Margrave Leopold IV signed the Treaty of Mautern, which referred to Vienna as a civitas for the first time and transferred St. Peter's Church to the Diocese of Passau. Under the treaty, Margrave Leopold IV also received from the bishop extended stretches of land beyond the city walls, with the notable exception of the territory allocated for the new parish church, which would eventually become St. Stephen's Cathedral. This discovery suggests that an even older religious building on this site predated the St. Rupert's Church, which is considered the oldest church in Vienna.

Founded in 1137 following the Treaty of Mautern, the partially constructed Romanesque church was solemnly dedicated in 1147 to Saint Stephen in the presence of Conrad III of Germany, Bishop Otto of Freising, and other German nobles who were about to embark on the Second Crusade.  Although the first structure was completed in 1160, major reconstruction and expansion lasted until 1511, and repair and restoration projects continue to the present day. From 1230 to 1245, the initial Romanesque structure was extended westward; the present-day west wall and Romanesque towers date from this period. In 1258, however, a great fire destroyed much of the original building, and a larger replacement structure, also Romanesque in style and reusing the two towers, was constructed over the ruins of the old church and consecrated 23 April 1263. The anniversary of this second consecration is commemorated each year by a rare ringing of the Pummerin bell for three minutes in the evening.

In 1304, King Albert I ordered a Gothic three-nave choir to be constructed east of the church, wide enough to meet the tips of the old transepts. Under his son Duke Albert II, work continued on the Albertine choir, which was consecrated in 1340 on the 77th anniversary of the previous consecration. The middle nave is largely dedicated to St. Stephen and All Saints, while the north and south nave, are dedicated to St. Mary and the Apostles respectively. Duke Rudolf IV, the Founder, Albert II's son, expanded the choir again to increase the religious clout of Vienna. On 7 April 1359, Rudolf IV laid the cornerstone for a westward Gothic extension of the Albertine choir in the vicinity of the present south tower. This expansion would eventually encapsulate the entirety of the old church, and in 1430, the edifice of the old church was removed from within as work progressed on the new cathedral. The south tower was completed in 1433, and vaulting of the nave took place from 1446 to 1474. The foundation for a north tower was laid in 1450, and construction began under master Lorenz Spenning, but its construction was abandoned when major work on the cathedral ceased in 1511.

In 1365, just six years after beginning the Gothic extension of the Albertine choir, Rudolf IV disregarded St. Stephen's status as a mere parish church and presumptuously established a chapter of canons befitting a large cathedral. This move was only the first step in fulfilling Vienna's long-held desire to obtain its own diocese; in 1469, Emperor Frederick III prevailed upon Pope Paul II to grant Vienna its own bishop, to be appointed by the emperor. Despite long-standing resistance by the Bishops of Passau, who did not wish to lose control of the area, the Diocese of Vienna was canonically established on 18 January 1469, with St. Stephen's Cathedral as its mother church. In 1722 during the reign of Karl VI, Pope Innocent XIII elevated the see to an archbishopric.

During World War II, the cathedral was saved from intentional destruction at the hands of retreating German forces when Wehrmacht Captain Gerhard Klinkicht disregarded orders from the city commandant, "Sepp" Dietrich, to "fire a hundred shells and reduce it to rubble". On 12 April 1945, civilian looters lit fires in nearby shops as Soviet Army troops entered the city.  The winds carried the fire to the cathedral, where it severely damaged the roof, causing it to collapse. Fortunately, protective brick shells built around the pulpit, Frederick III's tomb, and other treasures, minimized damage to the most valuable artworks. However, the Rollinger choir stalls, carved in 1487, could not be saved. Reconstruction began immediately after the war, with a limited reopening 12 December 1948 and a full reopening 23 April 1952.

Exterior
The church was dedicated to St. Stephen, also the patron of the bishop's cathedral in Passau, and so was oriented toward the sunrise on his feast day of 26 December, as the position stood in the year that construction began. Over the centuries, soot and other forms of air pollution accumulating on the church have given it a black colour, but recent restoration projects have again returned some portions of the building to their original white.

Towers

Its construction lasted 65 years, from 1368 to 1433. During the Siege of Vienna in 1529 and again during the Battle of Vienna in 1683, it served as the main observation and command post for the defence of the walled city, and it even contains an apartment for the watchmen who, until 1955, manned the tower at night and rang the bells if a fire was spotted in the city. At the tip of the tower stands the double-eagle imperial emblem with the Habsburg-Lorraine coat of arms on its chest, surmounted by a double-armed apostolic cross, which refers to Apostolic Majesty, the imperial style of kings of Hungary. This emblem replaced earlier crescent and the six-pointed star emblem. The original emblem, as well as a couple of later ones, today can be seen at the Vienna City Museum.

The north tower was originally intended to mirror the south tower, but the design proved too ambitious, considering the era of Gothic cathedrals was nearing its end, and construction was halted in 1511. In 1578, the tower-stump was augmented with a Renaissance cap, nicknamed the "water tower top" by the Viennese.

The main entrance to the church is named the Giant's Door, or Riesentor, possibly referring to the thighbone of a mammoth that hung over it for decades after being unearthed in 1443 while digging the foundations for the north tower, or else to the funnel shape of the door, from the Middle High German word risen, meaning 'sink or 'fall'. The name for the towers derives from the fact that they were constructed from the rubble of old structures built by the Romans (German Heiden meaning heathens or pagans) during their occupation of the area. Square at the base and octagonal above the roofline, the Heidentürme originally housed bells; those in the south tower were lost during World War II, but the north tower remains an operational bell tower. The Roman Towers, together with the Giant's Door, are the oldest parts of the church.

Roof

Above the choir on the south side of the building the tiles form a mosaic of the double-headed eagle that is symbolic of the empire ruled from Vienna by the Habsburg dynasty. On the north side, the coats of arms of the City of Vienna and of the Republic of Austria are depicted. In 1945, fire caused by World War II damage to nearby buildings leapt to the north tower of the cathedral and destroyed the wooden framework of the roof. Replicating the original bracing for so large a roof (it rises 38 metres above the floor) would have been cost-prohibitive, so over 600 metric tons of steel bracing were used instead. The roof is so steep that it is sufficiently cleaned by the rain alone and is seldom covered by snow.

Bells
Composer Ludwig van Beethoven discovered the totality of his deafness when he saw birds flying out of the bell tower as a result of the bells' tolling but could not hear the bells. St. Stephen's Cathedral has 22 bells in total. The largest is officially named for St. Mary, but usually called Pummerin ("Boomer") and hangs in the north tower. At , it is the largest in Austria and the second-largest swinging bell in Europe after the  Peter in Cologne Cathedral).
Originally cast in 1711 from cannons captured from the Muslim invaders, it was recast (partly from its original metal) in 1951 after crashing onto the floor when its wooden cradle burned during the 1945 fire. It sounds on only a few special occasions each year, including the arrival of the new year. Also in this tower are two (formerly three) older bells that are no longer used:
Kleine Glocke ("small bell") cast around 1280;
Speisglocke ("dinner bell") cast in 1746;
and Zügenglocke ("processions bell") cast in 1830. However, the Kleine Glocke was restored at the Grassmayr foundry in Innsbruck in 2017 and rehung in the North Roman Tower.

A peal of eleven electrically operated bells, cast in 1960, hangs in the soaring south tower. Replacements for other ancient bells also lost in the 1945 fire, they are used during Masses at the cathedral: four are used for an ordinary Mass; the quantity increases to as many as ten for a major holiday Mass; and the eleventh and largest is added when the Cardinal Archbishop of Vienna himself is present. From the largest to the smallest, they are named the St. Stephen; St. Leopold; St. Christopher; St. Leonhard; St. Josef; St. Peter Canisius; St. Pius X (280 kg); All Saints; St. Clement Maria Hofbauer; St. Michael; and St. Tarsicius. Also in this tallest tower are the Primglocke (recast in 1772), which rings on the quarter hour, and the Uhrschälle (cast in 1449), which rings on the hour.

The north Roman Tower contains six bells, four of which were cast in 1772, that ring for evening prayers and toll for funerals. They are working bells of the cathedral and their names usually recall their original uses: Feuerin ("fire alarm" but now used as a call to evening prayers) cast in 1879; Kantnerin (calling the cantors (musicians) to Mass); Feringerin (used for High Mass on Sundays); Bieringerin ("beer ringer" for last call at taverns); Poor Souls (the funeral bell); Churpötsch (donated by the local curia in honour of the Maria Pötsch icon in the cathedral), and Kleine Glocke (cast in 1280 and is the oldest bell in the cathedral).

The 1945 fire destroyed the bells that hung in the south Roman Tower.

Fixtures on the outside walls

During the Middle Ages, major cities had their own set of measures and the public availability of these standards allowed visiting merchants to comply with local regulations. The official Viennese ell length standards for verifying the measure of different types of cloth sold are embedded in the cathedral wall, to the left of the main entrance. The linen ell, also called Viennese yard, and the drapery ell length standards consist of two iron bars. According to Franz Twaroch, the ratio between the linen ell and the drapery ell is exactly . The Viennese ells are mentioned for the first time in 1685 by the Canon Testarello della Massa in his book Beschreibung der ansehnlichen und berühmten St. Stephans-Domkirchen.

A memorial tablet (near location SJC on the Plan below) gives a detailed account of Wolfgang Amadeus Mozart's relationship with the cathedral, including the fact that he had been appointed an adjunct music director here shortly before his death. This was his parish church when he lived at the "Figaro House" and he was married here, two of his children were baptised here, and his funeral was held in the Chapel of the Cross (at location PES) inside.

Adjacent to the catacomb entrance is the Capistran Chancel, the pulpit (now outdoors at location SJC) from which St. John Capistrano and Hungarian general John Hunyadi preached a crusade in 1456 to repel Muslim invasions of Christian Europe. (See: Siege of Belgrade). The 18th century Baroque statue shows the Franciscan friar under an extravagant sunburst, trampling on a beaten Turk. This was the original cathedral's main pulpit inside until it was replaced by Niclaes Gerhaert van Leyden's pulpit in 1515.

A figure of Christ (at location CT) is known affectionately to the Viennese as "Christ with a toothache" (de:Zahnwehherrgott). At the southwest corner (location S) are various memorials from when the area outside the cathedral was a cemetery, as well as a recently restored 15th-century sundial on a flying buttress.

Interior

Altars
The main part of the church contains 18 altars, with more in the various chapels. The High Altar (HA) and the Wiener Neustadt Altar (WNA) are the most famous.

The first focal point of any visitor is the distant High Altar, built over seven years from 1641 to 1647 as part of the first refurbishment of the cathedral in the baroque style. The altar was built by Tobias Pock at the direction of Vienna's Bishop Philipp Friedrich Graf Breuner with marble from Poland, Styria and Tyrol. The High Altar represents the stoning of the church's patron St. Stephen. It is framed by figures of patron saints from the surrounding areas – Saints Leopold, Florian, Sebastian and Rochus – and surmounted with a statue of St. Mary which draws the beholder's eye to a glimpse of heaven where Christ waits for Stephen (the first martyr) to ascend from below.

The Wiener Neustädter Altar at the head of the north nave was ordered in 1447 by Emperor Frederick III, whose tomb is located in the opposite direction. On the predella is his famous A.E.I.O.U. device. Frederick ordered it for the Cistercian Viktring Abbey (near Klagenfurt) where it remained until the abbey was closed in 1786 as part of Emperor Joseph II's anti-clerical reforms. It was then sent to the Cistercian monastery of St. Bernard of Clairvaux (founded by Emperor Frederick III) in the city of Wiener Neustadt, and finally sold in 1885 to St. Stephen's Cathedral when the Wiener Neustadt monastery was closed after merging with Heiligenkreuz Abbey.

The Wiener Neustädter Altar is composed of two triptychs, the upper being four times taller than the lower one. When the lower panels are opened, the Gothic grate of the former reliquary depot above the altar is revealed. On weekdays, the four panels are closed and display a drab painted scene involving 72 saints. On Sundays, the panels are opened showing gilded wooden figures depicting events in the life of the Virgin Mary.

Máriapócs Icon

The Maria Pötsch Icon (MP) is a Byzantine style icon of St. Mary with the child Jesus. The icon takes its name from the Hungarian Byzantine Catholic shrine of Máriapócs (pronounced Poach), from where it was transferred to Vienna. The picture shows the Virgin Mary pointing to the child (signifying "He is the way") and the child holding a three-stemmed rose (symbolizing the Holy Trinity) and wearing a prescient cross from his neck. The 50 x 70 cm icon was commissioned in 1676 from painter István Papp by László Csigri upon his release as a prisoner of war from the Turks who were invading Hungary at the time. As Csigri was unable to pay the 6-forint fee the icon was bought by Lőrinc Hurta who donated it to the church of Pócs.

After claims of two miraculous incidents in 1696 with the mother in the picture allegedly shedding real tears, Emperor Leopold I ordered it brought to St. Stephen's Cathedral, where it would be safe from the Muslim armies that still controlled much of Hungary. Upon its arrival after a triumphal five-month journey in 1697, Empress Eleonora Magdalena commissioned the splendid Rosa Mystica oklad and framework (now one of several) for it, and the Emperor personally ordered the icon placed near the High Altar in the front of the church, where it stood prominently from 1697 until 1945. Since then, it has been in a different framework, above an altar under a medieval stone baldachin near the southwest corner of the nave – where the many burning candles indicate the extent of its veneration, especially by Hungarians. Since its arrival the picture has not been seen weeping again but other miracles and answered prayers have been attributed to it, including Prince Eugene of Savoy's victory over the Turks at Zenta few weeks after the icon's installation in the Stephansdom.

The residents of Pócs wanted their holy miracle-working painting returned, but the emperor sent them a copy instead. Since then, the copy has been reported to weep real tears and work miracles, so the village changed its name from merely Pócs to Máriapócs and has become an important pilgrimage site.

Pulpit

The stone pulpit is a masterwork of late Gothic sculpture. Long attributed to Anton Pilgram, today Niclaes Gerhaert van Leyden is thought more likely to be the carver. So that the local language sermon could be better heard by the worshipers in the days before microphones and loudspeakers, the pulpit stands against a pillar out in the nave, instead of in the chancel at the front of the church.

The sides of the pulpit erupt like stylized petals from the stem supporting it. On those Gothic petals are relief portraits of the four original Doctors of the Church (St. Augustine of Hippo, St. Ambrose, St. Gregory the Great and St. Jerome), each of them in one of four different temperaments and in one of four different stages of life. The handrail of the stairway curving its way around the pillar from ground level to the pulpit has fantastic decorations of toads and lizards biting each other, symbolizing the fight of good against evil. At the top of the stairs, a stone puppy protects the preacher from intruders.

Beneath the stairs is one of the most beloved symbols of the cathedral: a stone self-portrait of the unknown sculptor gawking (German: gucken) out of a window (German: fenster) and thus famously known as the Fenstergucker. The chisel in the subject's hand, and the stonemason's signature mark on the shield above the window led to the speculation that it could be a self-portrait of the sculptor.

Chapels

There are several formal chapels in St. Stephen's Cathedral:
 St. Katherine's Chapel, in the base of the south tower, is the baptismal chapel. The 14-sided baptismal font was completed in 1481, and its cover was formerly the soundboard above the famed pulpit in the main church. Its marble base shows the four Evangelists, while the niches of the basin feature the twelve apostles, Christ and St. Stephan.
 St. Barbara's Chapel, in the base of the north tower, is used for meditation and prayer.
 St. Eligius's Chapel, in the southeast corner, is open for prayer. The altar is dedicated to St. Valentine whose body (one of three, held by various churches) is in another chapel, upstairs.
 St. Bartholomew's Chapel, above St. Eligius' Chapel, has recently been restored.
 The Chapel of the Cross (PES), in the northeast corner, holds the burial place of Prince Eugene of Savoy in the vault containing 3 coffins and a heart urn, under a massive stone slab with iron rings. The funeral of Mozart occurred here on 6 December 1791. The beard on the crucified Christ above the altar is of real hair. The chapel is not open to the public.
 St. Valentine's Chapel, above the Chapel of the Cross, is the current depository of the hundreds of relics belonging to the Stephansdom, including a piece of the tablecloth from the Last Supper. A large chest holds the bones of St. Valentine that were moved here about a century ago, from what is now the Chapter House to the south of the High Altar.

Tombs, catacombs, and crypts

Since its earliest days, the cathedral has been surrounded by cemeteries dating back to Roman times, and has sheltered the bodies of notables and commoners. It has always been an honour to be buried inside a church, close to the physical presence of the saints whose relics are preserved there. Those less honoured were buried near, but outside, the church.

Inside the cathedral are the tombs of Prince Eugene of Savoy (PES), commander of the Imperial forces during the War of the Spanish Succession in the Chapel of The Cross (northwest corner of the cathedral) and of Frederick III, Holy Roman Emperor (Fr3), under whose reign the Diocese of Vienna was canonically erected on 18 January 1469, in the Apostles' Choir (southeast corner of the cathedral).

The construction of Emperor Frederick's tomb spanned over 45 years, starting 25 years before his death. The impressive sarcophagus is made of the unusually dense red marble-like stone found at the Adnet quarry. Carved by Niclaes Gerhaert van Leyden, the tomb lid shows Emperor Frederick in his coronation regalia surrounded by the coats of arms of all of his dominions. The body of the tomb has 240 statues and is a glory of medieval sculptural art.

When the charnel house and eight cemeteries abutting the cathedral's side and back walls closed due to an outbreak of bubonic plague in 1735, the bones within them were moved to the catacombs below the church. Burials directly in the catacombs occurred until 1783 when a new law forbade most burials within the city. The remains of over 11,000 persons are in the catacombs (which may be toured).

The basement of the cathedral also hosts the Bishops, Provosts and Ducal crypts. The most recent interment in the Bishop's crypt completed in 1952 under the south choir was that of 98-year-old Cardinal Franz König in 2004. Provosts of the cathedral are buried in another chamber. Other members of the cathedral chapter are now buried in a special section at the Zentralfriedhof.

The Ducal Crypt located under the chancel holds 78 bronze containers with the bodies, hearts, or viscera of 72 members of the Habsburg dynasty. Before his death in 1365, Duke Rudolf IV ordered the crypt built for his remains in the new cathedral he commissioned. By 1754, the small rectangular chamber was overcrowded with 12 sarcophagi and 39 urns, so the area was expanded with an oval chamber added to the east end of the rectangular one. In 1956, the two chambers were renovated and their contents rearranged. The sarcophagi of Duke Rudolf IV and his wife were placed upon a pedestal and the 62 urns containing organs were moved from the two rows of shelves around the new chamber to cabinets in the original one.

Organs
St Stephen's Cathedral has an old organ tradition. The first organ is mentioned in 1334.  After the 1945 fire, Michael Kauffmann finished a large electric action pipe organ in 1960 with 125 stops and 4 manuals, financed with public donations. In 1991, the Austrian firm of Rieger rebuilt the choir organ. It is a mechanical organ, with 56 voices and 4 manuals.

The Kauffmann organ at the west end was only used for about 35 years before falling into disuse. In 2017-2020 the Austrian firm of Rieger rebuilt the west end (Riesenorgel) organ using the 1960 facade and some old pipework and this resulted in an organ of 5 manuals with 130 stops.  The choir organ has its own console but there is a separate console, built 2017-2020 and comprising 5 manuals with 185 stops, from which the Riesenorgel and choir organ can be played at the same time. In addition to the Riesenorgel and choir organ the Cathedral also has 3 smaller instruments.

Conservation and restoration

Preservation and repair of the fabric of the medieval cathedral has been a continuous process at St. Stephen's Cathedral since its original construction in 1147.

The porous limestone is subject to weathering, but coating it with a sealer like silicone would simply trap moisture inside the stone and cause it to crack faster when the water freezes.
The permanent Dombauhütte (Construction Department) uses the latest scientific techniques (including laser cleaning of delicate features on stonework), and is investigating a process that would impregnate the cavities within the stone with something that would keep water from having a place to infiltrate.

The most visible current repair project is a multi-year renovation of the tall south tower, for which scaffolding has been installed. Fees from advertising on the netting around the scaffolding were defraying some of the costs of the work, but the concept of such advertising was controversial and has been discontinued. As of December 2008, the majority of the restoration on the south tower has been finished, and most scaffolding removed.

Systematic cleaning of the interior is gradually proceeding around the walls, and an outdoor relief of Christ in Gethsemane is being restored.

A major project has been recently completed for which visitors and worshippers in St. Stephen's Cathedral had been waiting since 1147: better heating of the church during the winter. Previous systems, including fireplaces, just deposited soot and grease on the artwork, but the new system uses apparatus in many different locations so that there is little moving airflow to carry damaging particles.

Some of the architectural drawings date from the Middle Ages and are on paper 15 ft long and too fragile to handle. Laser measurements of the ancient cathedral have now been made so that a digital 3-dimensional virtual model of the cathedral now exists in its computers, and detailed modern plans can be output at will. When weathered stonework needs to be repaired or replaced, the computerized system can create life-sized models to guide the nine full-time stonemasons on staff in the on-site workshops against the north wall of the cathedral.

On 29 March 2014, a 37-year-old man vandalized the interior of the cathedral by pushing the statue of St. Jude Thaddeus from its marble base.

In January 2020, art historians discovered a mural under layers of dirt on the wall of what is now the cathedral's gift shop. It is believed to be the work of the Renaissance artist Albrecht Dürer.

Notable people, events and burials
Notable musicians who have been Kapellmeister at St. Stephen's include:
Johann Joseph Fux 1701–1712
Georg Reutter 1715–1728
Johann Georg Reinhardt 1728–1738
Johann Georg Reutter 1738–1772 – kapellmeister when Joseph Haydn and his brothers were choirboys 
Leopold Hoffmann 1772–1793
Johann Georg Albrechtsberger 1793–1809
Joseph Preindl 1809–1823
Johann Baptist Gänsbacher 1823–1844
Joseph Drechsler 1844–1852
Johann Baptist Krall

The cathedral has hosted the weddings and funerals of many notable figures in Austrian and European history.
Weddings of royalty: Louis II of Hungary and Mary of Austria (1515); Ferdinand I, Holy Roman Emperor and Anne of Bohemia and Hungary (1515)
Weddings of musicians: Teresa Cornelys and Angelo Pompeati (1745); Joseph Haydn and Maria Anna Theresia Keller (1760); Wolfgang Amadeus Mozart and Constanze Weber (1782) – Mozart's funeral in 1791 took place in the Chapel of the Holy Cross
Funeral of Antonio Vivaldi (1741) 
Wedding of Antonie Brentano (1798), a patroness of the arts who is speculated to be Beethoven's "Immortal Beloved"
Funerals of members of the House of Habsburg: Franz Joseph I of Austria (1916), Emperor of Austria during World War I and Kaiser for 68 years; Zita of Bourbon-Parma (1989), last Empress of Austria; Otto von Habsburg (2011), last Crown-Prince of Austria-Hungary
Funerals of European royalty: Matthias Corvinus (also Matthias I), King of Hungary and Croatia
Funerals of politicians: Thomas Klestil (2004), former president of Austria; Kurt Waldheim (2007), former president of Austria and Secretary-General of the United Nations
Funeral of Niki Lauda (2019), former Formula One world champion and entrepreneur.

Notable figures buried in the crypt: (For a list of nobility buried in the crypt, see Ducal Crypt, Vienna)
Johannes Cuspinian (born Johan Spießhaymer) – Austrian humanist, historian, scientist, and diplomat
Elisabeth of Austria, Queen of France – wife of Charles IX of France, remains transferred to crypt after death
Jan van Hoogstraten – Dutch Golden Age painter
Neidhart von Reuental – minnesinger
Former Archbishops of Vienna: Christoph Anton Migazzi, Johann Rudolf Kutschker, Joseph Othmar Rauscher

Stephansdom in popular culture
As Vienna's landmark, the St. Stephen's Cathedral is featured in media including films, video games, and television shows. These include The Third Man and Burnout 3. The cathedral is also depicted on the Austrian 10 cent euro coins and on the packaging of the Manner-Schnitten wafer treat.  The Archdiocese of Vienna allowed the Manner company to use the cathedral as its logo in return for funding the wages of one stonemason doing repair work on the cathedral.  In 2008, Sarah Brightman performed a concert promoting her latest album, Symphony, which was recorded for a TV broadcast and a further DVD release in late September.

Balassi Mass
Since 2008, the two sabres of the Balint Balassi Memorial Sword Award, founded by Pal Molnar, have been blessed during a Balassi Mass held a few days before the award ceremony.  On 25 January 2013, in the presence of some three hundred Hungarians, Bishop Laszlo Kiss-Rigo blessed the two swords during a Mass celebrated in the cathedral.

Gallery

See also
 List of tallest churches
 Stephansplatz, Vienna
 List of Gothic Cathedrals in Europe
 List of tallest structures built before the 20th century

References

Citations

Sources

External links

 Official website
 St. Stephen's Cathedral tours
 St. Stephen's Cathedral concerts 
 St. Stephen's Cathedral museum
 St. Stephen's Cathedral guided tour
 St. Stephen's Cathedral permanent construction office 
 St. Stephen's Cathedral association 
 Archdiocese of Vienna 

 
Churches completed in 1147
Roman Catholic churches completed in 1511
Buildings and structures in Innere Stadt
Roman Catholic cathedrals in Austria
Roman Catholic church buildings in the Archdiocese of Vienna
Roman Catholic churches in Vienna
Tourist attractions in Vienna
Gothic architecture in Austria
Romanesque architecture in Austria
Art museums and galleries in Vienna
Religious museums in Austria
12th-century Roman Catholic church buildings in Austria
16th-century Roman Catholic church buildings in Austria